Haben is a surname. Notable people with the surname include:

Surnames
Andrew Haben (1834–1908), Prussian-born businessman and politician
Ralph Haben (born 1941), American politician
Stefan Haben (born 1987), German football player

See also
Haben Girma (born 1988), deafblind lawyer